Avast Software s.r.o. is a Czech multinational cybersecurity software company headquartered in Prague, Czech Republic that researches and develops computer security software, machine learning and artificial intelligence. Avast has more than 435 million monthly active users and the second largest market share among anti-malware application vendors worldwide as of April 2020. The company has approximately 1,700 employees across its 25 offices worldwide. In July 2021, NortonLifeLock, an American cybersecurity company, announced that it is in talks to merge with Avast Software. In August 2021, Avast's board of directors agreed to an offer of US$8 billion.

Avast was founded by Pavel Baudiš and Eduard Kučera in 1988 as a cooperative. It had been a private company since 2010 and had its IPO in May 2018. In July 2016, Avast acquired competitor AVG Technologies for $1.3 billion. At the time, AVG was the third-ranked antivirus product. It was dual-listed on the Prague Stock Exchange and on the London Stock Exchange and was a constituent of the FTSE 100 Index until it was acquired by NortonLifeLock in September 2022.

The company's main product is the Avast Antivirus along with tools such as the Avast Secure Browser and the Avast SecureLine VPN.

Avast produces Avast Online Security, which is its main extension, but it also has extensions like Avast SafePrice and Avast Passwords.

History
Avast was founded by Eduard Kučera and Pavel Baudiš in 1988. The founders met each other at the Research Institute for Mathematical Machines in Czechoslovakia. They studied math and computer science, because the Communist Party of Czechoslovakia would require them to join the communist party to study physics. At the institute, Pavel Baudiš discovered the Vienna virus on a floppy disk and developed the first program to remove it. Afterwards, he asked Eduard Kucera to join him in cofounding Avast as a cooperative. The cooperative was originally called Alwil and only the software was named Avast.

The cooperative was changed to a joint partnership in 1991, two years after the velvet revolution caused a regime change in Czechoslovakia. The new regime severed ties with the Soviet Union and reverted the country's economic system to a market economy. In 1995, Avast employee  wrote the first antivirus program for the Windows 95 operating system. In the 1990s security researchers at the Virus Bulletin, an IT security testing organization, gave the Avast software an award in every category tested, increasing the popularity of the software. However, by the late 1990s, the company was struggling financially. Alwil rebuffed acquisition offers by McAfee, who was licensing the Avast antivirus engine.

By 2001, Alwil was experiencing financial difficulties, when it converted to a freemium model, offering a base Avast software product at no cost. As a result of the freemium model, the number of users of the software grew to one million by 2004 and 20 million by 2006. Former Symantec executive Vince Steckler was appointed CEO of Avast in 2009. In 2010, Alwil changed its name to Avast, adopting the name of the software, and raised $100 million in venture capital investments. The following December, Avast filed for an initial public offering, but withdrew its application the following July, citing changes in market conditions. In 2012, Avast fired its outsourced tech support service iYogi, after it was discovered that iYogi was using misleading sales tactics to persuade customers to buy unnecessary services. By 2013, Avast had 200 million users in 38 countries and had been translated into 43 languages. At the time, the company had 350 employees.

In 2014, CVC Capital bought an interest in Avast for an undisclosed sum. The purchase valued Avast at $1 billion. Later that year, Avast acquired mobile app developer Inmite in order to build Avast's mobile apps. Additionally, in 2014 Avast's online support forum was compromised, exposing 400,000 names, passwords and email addresses. By 2015, Avast had the largest share of the market for antivirus software. In July 2016, Avast reached an agreement to buy AVG for $1.3 billion. AVG was a large IT security company that sold software for desktops and mobile devices. In July 2017, Avast acquired UK-based Piriform for an undisclosed sum. Piriform was the developer of CCleaner. Shortly afterwards it was disclosed that someone may have created a malicious version of CCleaner with a backdoor for hackers. Avast had its IPO on the London Stock Exchange in May 2018, which valued it at £2.4bn and was one of the UK's biggest technology listings.

 assumed the role of CEO and co-owner of Avast Plc in July 2019. A day later, he changed his annual pay to $1 and pledged his board director's compensation of $100,000 to charity. In October 2019 Jaya Baloo joined Avast as their Chief Information Security Officer.

In April 2020, Avast released a new secure, private mobile web browser for Android based on technology acquired from previously unreported acquisition of Tenta, a Seattle-based startup.

In July 2021, NortonLifeLock, an American cybersecurity company, announced that it is in talks to merge with Avast Software. In August 2021, Avast's board of directors agreed to an offer of US$8 billion. In September 2022, the Competition and Markets Authority approved the proposed takeover by NortonLifeLock so allowing the transaction to be completed.

Products

Avast develops and markets business and consumer IT security products for servers, desktops, and mobile devices. The company sells both the Avast product line and the acquired AVG-branded products. As of late 2017, the company had merged the AVG and Avast business product lines and were working to integrate the corporate departments from both companies. Additionally, Avast has developed utility software products to improve battery life on mobile devices, cleanup unnecessary files on a hard drive, find secure wireless networks or create a VPN connection to the internet.

Avast and AVG consumer security software are sold on a freemium model, where basic security features are free, but more advanced features require purchasing a premium version. The free version is also supported by ads. Additionally, all Avast users provide data about their PC or mobile device to Avast, which is used to identify new security threats. Antivirus scanning, browser cleanup, a secure browser, password management, and network security features are provided for free, while firewall, anti-spam, and online banking features have to be purchased. According to PC Pro, the software does not "nag" users about upgrading. About 3% of Avast's users pay for a premium version (10% in the US).

The Avast business product family includes features for endpoint protection, Wi-Fi security, antivirus, identity protection, password management, and data protection. For example, the desktop product will look for vulnerabilities in the wi-fi network and run applications suspect of having malicious software in an isolated sandbox. The Avast Business Managed Workplace monitors and manages desktops, and assesses on-site security protocols. The company also sells management software for IT administrators to deploy and manage Avast installations.

Reception

In 2021, PC Magazine gave Avast Free Antivirus software an overall score of 4 out of 5 and gave AVG, which was purchased by Avast in 2016, a score of 4, plus "AVG AntiVirus Free offers precisely the same virus protection engine as Avast Free Antivirus, but it lacks the impressive collection of additional features you get with Avast." In tests conducted by the AV-TEST Institute in August 2021, Avast and AVG received six out of six points for protection and usability, and six out of six points for performance. A review in Tom's Guide says that the free Avast antivirus product has "good protection against malware" and takes up little space on the system. The review says that Avast has a competitive set of features for a free antivirus product, but the scans are sometimes not very fast.

The Avast antivirus product for business users received 4 out of 5 by TechRadar in 2017. The review said that the software had good features, protection, configuration and an "excellent interface", but it took up a lot of hard disk space and did not cover mobile devices. According to Tom's Guide, the mobile version is inexpensive and packed with features. PC Magazine said that the mobile version "has almost all the security features you could want."

AVG has also generally performed well in lab tests. A review in Tom's Hardware gave the AVG software seven out of ten stars. The review highlighted that  the software has a small system footprint and has good malware protection, but does not have a quick scan option and lacks many additional features.

Collection and sale of user data

In late 2019, Avast browser extensions were found to collect user data, including browsing behavior and history, and send it to a remote server. The discovery led to the extensions of the Avast and AVG brands being temporarily removed from the Google Chrome, Firefox and Opera extension stores, however, they returned a short time later as there was no concrete evidence that demonstrated a breach of private data of the users.

In January 2020, a joint investigation by Motherboard and PCMag found that the Avast Antivirus and AVG AntiVirus Free version were collecting user data, which was being resold to personalize advertising through a subsidiary, Jumpshot. The leaked documents showed that Jumpshot offered to provide its customers with "Every search. Every click. On every site." from more than 100 million compromised devices. In response, Avast announced on January 30, 2020, that it would immediately shut down Jumpshot and cease all operations due to the backlash of its users' data privacy.

On the basis of the information revealed, on 11 February 2020 the Czech Office for Personal Data Protection announced that it had initiated a preliminary investigation.

See also
 Comparison of antivirus software
 Comparison of firewalls

References

External links
 

 
1988 establishments in Czechoslovakia
Software companies of the Czech Republic
Multinational companies headquartered in the Czech Republic
Companies based in Prague
Software companies established in 1988
Czech brands
Computer security software companies
Companies formerly listed on the London Stock Exchange
Former cooperatives
Gen Digital acquisitions
2018 initial public offerings
2022 mergers and acquisitions